Frank Owen Reynolds (21 August 1917 – 20 March 2001) was a British and English international field hockey player who competed in the 1948 Summer Olympics. He was a member of the British field hockey team, which won the silver medal. He played all five matches as halfback. He died in Monmouth in March 2001.

References

External links
 
Official profile

1917 births
2001 deaths
Welsh male field hockey players
Olympic field hockey players of Great Britain
British male field hockey players
Field hockey players at the 1948 Summer Olympics
Olympic silver medallists for Great Britain
Olympic medalists in field hockey
Welsh Olympic medallists
Medalists at the 1948 Summer Olympics